Shuya may refer to:

Places
Shuya (inhabited locality), name of several inhabited localities in Russia
Shuya (Karelia), Neva basin, Russia
Shuya (Kostroma Oblast), Volga basin, Russia

People with the given name
, Japanese footballer 
, Japanese footballer
, Japanese footballer 
, Japanese footballer

Fictional characters
Shuya Nanahara, a manga character

Japanese masculine given names